Estômbar-Lagoa railway station (Portuguese: Estação Ferroviária de Estômbar-Lagoa) is a railway station on the Algarve line which serves Lagoa Municipality and is located in Estômbar, Portugal. It opened on the 15th of February 1903.

History 
On the 8th of November 1997, two trains crashed close to Estômbar, killing four people and injuring 14.

References 

Railway stations in Portugal
Railway stations opened in 1903